An Hyo-Yeon (or  ; born 16 April 1978 in Incheon) is a South Korean retired footballer who played as striker.

His previous clubs were Kyoto Purple Sanga and Yokohama FC in Japan, Busan I'cons, Suwon Samsung Bluewings, Seongnam Ilhwa Chunma and Chunnam Dragons in South Korea. He was also registered as a Home United player in the S.League when their player registration period opens in June 2010. In September 2010 he joined Persela Lamongan before left in early January 2011.

International career
An played for the South Korea national team at 2001 FIFA Confederations Cup in South Korea and Japan.

He also played for South Korea at the 1997 FIFA U-17 World Championship in China.

Club statistics

National team statistics

International goals
Results list South Korea's goal tally first.

References

External links

 National Team Player Record 
 FIFA Player Statistics
 

1978 births
Living people
Association football wingers
South Korean footballers
South Korean expatriate footballers
South Korea international footballers
Kyoto Sanga FC players
Busan IPark players
Suwon Samsung Bluewings players
Seongnam FC players
Jeonnam Dragons players
Yokohama FC players
Home United FC players
Persela Lamongan players
PSMS Medan players
J1 League players
J2 League players
K League 1 players
Singapore Premier League players
Liga 1 (Indonesia) players
Indonesian Premier League players
Expatriate footballers in Japan
2001 FIFA Confederations Cup players
2002 CONCACAF Gold Cup players
South Korean expatriate sportspeople in Japan
South Korean expatriate sportspeople in Singapore
Expatriate footballers in Singapore
South Korean expatriate sportspeople in Indonesia
Expatriate footballers in Indonesia
Sportspeople from Incheon
Dongguk University alumni
Footballers at the 1998 Asian Games
Asian Games competitors for South Korea